Leyla Aghalar gizi Badirbeyli and Leyla Badirbeyova – (after marriage – Javanshirova); (1920–1999), Soviet and Azerbaijani actress of theatre and cinema, People's Artist of the Azerbaijan SSR (1959), laureate of the State Stalin Prize of the second degree (1946), member of the CPSU from 1945. She is buried in the Alley of Honor.

Biography
Leyla Badirbeyli was born on 8 January 1920 in Baku, in the family of Aghalar Badirbeyov, from the generation of Shamkir beys. In 1936, she became the soloist of the Song and Dance Ensemble of Azerbaijan, where she worked up until 1942. In 1942, on guidance of the Azerbaijan State Drama Theatre, named after Meshadi Azizbeyov's invitation, she began to perform on the stage of this theatre. Later she narrated:

{| border="0" cellpadding="2" cellspacing="2" align="center"
| width="50%" style="background:#f6f6f6;" |
"Theatre is related to me with the names of such coryphaeus as Mehdi Mammadov, Adil Isgenderov, Aliheydar Alakbarov. My activity in cinema and theatre was in wartime, but in spite of that, these years were very productive in the world of arts and also for me…"
|}

In 1945, Bedirbeyli played Gulchohra's part from "Arshin mal alan" musical comedy. Henceforth she played memorable roles in such films as "Fatali khan", "Meeting", "Shadows are crawling", "Her great heart", "Koroghlu", "Indomitable Kura", "Sevil", "Boys of our street", "One fine day", "Dervish is blowing up Paris" etc. In 1951, Leyla Badirbeyli graduated from Azerbaijan State Theatrical Institute named after M.A.Aliyev.
Badirbeyli married Fərəc Cavanşirov, a Javanshir noble descended from Ibrahim Khalil Khan. The two had a son named Javanshir, known as Elhan. The couple split up later in life.

The actress died on 23 November 1999.

Filmography

Awards
 State Stalin Prize of the second degree (1946) – for playing Gulchohra's role in the film "Arshin mal alan".
 State Premium of the Azerbaijan SSR, named after Mirza Fatali Akhundov (1972)
 People's Artist of the Azerbaijan SSR (1959)

References

See also
List of People's Artists of the Azerbaijan SSR

1920 births
Actors from Baku
1999 deaths
Stalin Prize winners
People's Artists of the Azerbaijan SSR
Communist Party of the Soviet Union members
Azerbaijani film actresses
Azerbaijani stage actresses
Soviet stage actresses
Soviet film actresses
Soviet Azerbaijani people
Azerbaijani communists
Recipients of the Istiglal Order
Burials at Alley of Honor